Matobo is a village in Central District of Botswana. It is located 10 km south-east of Tutume, close to the border with Zimbabwe. The village has a primary school and the population was 1,314 in 2001 census.

References

Populated places in Central District (Botswana)
Villages in Botswana